The Prison of Migration is an artistic Albanian film that treats the real situation of the 1990s Albania. It shows the suffering of Albanians away from their country, and trying to stay away from foreign jails of ex-Yugoslavia.

References 

1990 films
Albanian historical drama films
Albanian-language films
1990 drama films
1990s historical films